Ariel Mbumba (born 24 September 2001) is a Congolese professional footballer who plays as a midfielder for MLS Next Pro club Columbus Crew 2.

Club career
Born in Kinshasa, Mbumba moved with his family to San Jose in the United States. He joined the youth setup of Major League Soccer club San Jose Earthquakes in 2015 before joining Silicon Valley Soccer Academy, then Juventus Sport Club later that year. He stayed with Silicon Valley SA until 2018 when he briefly joined the Portland Timbers youth academy. He then returned to the Bay Area and joined De Anza Force.

Oakland Roots
Mbumba joined National Independent Soccer Association club Oakland Roots prior to the 2020 Spring Season and played in their opening match against Chattanooga FC. He came on as a substitute in the 1–1 draw. Following the club's move to the USL Championship, Mbumba was re-signed prior to the 2021 season. In the club's opening match of the season on 8 May 2021 against Phoenix Rising, Mbumba came on as a 78th minute substitute in the 3–0 defeat.

On 2 June 2021, Mbumba scored his first goal for Oakland Roots during their 3–3 draw against Sacramento Republic.

Columbus Crew 2
Mbumba transferred to MLS Next Pro side Columbus Crew 2 on August 12, 2022. Mbumba was the last remaining player on Roots SC from their first season.

Career statistics

References

External links
 Profile at Oakland Roots

2001 births
Living people
Footballers from Kinshasa
Democratic Republic of the Congo footballers
Association football midfielders
Oakland Roots SC players
Columbus Crew 2 players
National Independent Soccer Association players
USL Championship players
Soccer players from California
Democratic Republic of the Congo expatriate footballers
Expatriate soccer players in the United States
21st-century Democratic Republic of the Congo people
MLS Next Pro players
De Anza Force players